Mitchell S. Weiss (born 1957) is an American investigative journalist, and an editor at The Charlotte Observer.  He won the 2004 Pulitzer Prize for Investigative Reporting, with Joe Mahr and Michael D. Sallah.

Life
Weiss is a native of New York City.  He graduated from Northwestern University with an MS in journalism in 1982.  He was an Associated Press reporter in Toledo and Columbus, Ohio. From 1998 to 2005 he worked for The Blade. In 2005, he was deputy business editor of The Charlotte Observer. In 2008, he was correspondent to the Charlotte Bureau of the Associated Press.

Weiss teaches journalism at the University of South Carolina Upstate.  He was a finalist for the Gerald Loeb Award in 2009.

Works
With Michael Sallah. 
 With Kevin Maurer. No Way Out: A Story of Valor in the Mountains of Afghanistan.  Berkley, 2012.  
 With Kevin Maurer. Hunting Che: How a U.S. Special Forces Team Helped Capture the World’s Most Famous Revolutionary. Berkley, 2013.  
 With Michael Sallah. The Yankee Comandante: The Untold Story of Courage, Passion, and One American's Fight to Liberate Cuba.  Lyons Press, 2015. 
 
 With Chris Wallace.

References

External links
 On Tiger Force at the Pritzker Military Museum & Library
http://fora.tv/2006/06/01/Michael_Sallah_and_Mitch_Weiss

1959 births
American investigative journalists
Pulitzer Prize for Investigative Reporting winners
Northwestern University alumni
Associated Press reporters
University of South Carolina Upstate faculty
Living people
Journalists from New York City